Siah Kaldeh (also Romanized as Sīāh Kaldeh; also known as Sīāh Galdeh) is a village in Divshal Rural District, in the Central District of Langarud County, Gilan Province, Iran. At the 2006 census, its population was 327, in 91 families.

References 

Populated places in Langarud County